Yoruba Andabo is a Cuban rumba ensemble founded in 1981 by conga drummer Pancho Quinto. It evolved from an amateur group known as Guaguancó Marítimo Portuario, established in 1961 in the docks of Havana. Together with Los Chinitos, Yoruba Andabo is one of the leading exponents of the guarapachangueo style of Cuban rumba, which incorporated Quinto's rhythmic ideas for batá and cajón (wooden box).

Yoruba Andabo's popularity increased throughout the 1980s, gaining exposure with the 1986 documentary El país de los oricha. The band gained international attention after their involvement in Jane Bunnett's album Spirits of Havana (recorded in 1991 and released in 1993), which was followed by the release of their 1993 album El callejón de los rumberos in North America in 1996. In 1995 they recorded Aché IV with Merceditas Valdés.

Around 1997 Quinto left Yoruba Andabo to record his first solo album En el solar la cueva del humo and continued collaborating with Jane Bunnett and other artists until his death in 2005. Meanwhile, Yoruba Andabo continued performing and making recordings. In 2005, they released Rumba en la Habana. Their latest albums are El espíritu de la rumba (2013), Soy de la tierra brava (2016) and Seguimos sonando (2021).

Members

References

Cuban musical groups
Rumba musical groups